Juan Pinilla Martin (Huétor-Tájar, January 2, 1981) is a flamenco singer from Granada (Spain), critic, writer and columnist. In August, 2007 he won the Festival del Cante de las Minas, with the prize Lámpara Minera 2007, considered the most important flamenco prize. He studied Translation and Interpretation. At present he studies Law. In 2014, he was nominated for the prestigious Latin Grammys Awards (Las Vegas, USA) In 2016 he was awarded the title of favorite son of the province of Granada (Spain) He is an artist committed with the social reasons. The night he won the Lámpara Minera he dedicated the prize to the workers victims of the workplaces accidents.

Biography 

Although he came later, Juan Pinilla belongs to a very important younger generation of artists of Granada: Estrella Morente, Marina Heredia and Victor ' Charico ' (died 2008), although the term " intellectual singer " with which usually present him in festivals and competitions, is undoubtedly his best mark:

Shangay Lily. Publico Journal . March 2012 .

Was fond since childhood classic sing, and learn from sources like Manuel Vallejo, Girl of the Combs, Thomas Pabon, Chacón, Cayetano Muriel, Antonio Mairena and Manuel Ávila Cobitos . Indirect disciple of the latter is considered . At 18 he began his university studies in Granada and becomes a regular of few flamingos and cultural events organized in the city, participating in conferences, workshops and discussions. He met teachers like Albaicin Curro, Curro Andres, Paco Moyano, José Carlos Zarate and Francisco Manuel Diaz of those who would learn later. Parallel befriends Francisco Avila, a great fan of the grenadian city of Montefrío, who introduced him in the forms of Manuel Avila, Chacón, Tomás Manuel Pabon and Vallejo. He won his first prizes in competitions íllora and Granada .

Although not very frequent contests has achieved a score of first and second prizes . The writer Paula Marin takes you first to La Peña Silverware, entity that later became a member of the board. Pinilla, while highlighting such great flamenco aficionado, is also a great fan of literature and the arts, a motif that has been incorporated for the first time flamenco figures like Groucho Marx, Nietzsche, Francisco Umbral, Mikel Laboa, Atahualpa Yupanky or Chavela Vargas

It also highlights their outreach Flamenco media, having been a critic and columnist for the 'La Opinión de Granada' journal, Granada Hoy journal and magazine El Olivo . He has been a lecturer and professor of flamenco in certain events and courses. Noted for his singing full of knowledge and shades, highlighted by critics as Estela Zatania, who told him about the performance that made the March 1, 2008 at the Festival de Jerez de la Frontera:

Estela Zatania. deflamenco.com

He has traveled countries like Japan, USA, Mexico, Brazil, France, Italy, Portugal, Luxembourg, England, Denmark, Sudan, Ethiopia, Egypt, Iran, Israel, Singapore, Poland, Austria, Germany, Czech Republic and Montenegro, among others. He designed several shows, most notably ' Damned ', which sets a poetic - musical among French damned poets and some Flemish artists parallelism. In October 2007 "La Platería", considered the dean of the Flamenco Associations in the world imposes him the Gold Badge of his organization, along with the dancers La Moneta and Patricia Guerrero. The Andalusian Youth Institute awarded him in March 2008, the prize "Art and Creation ' and in September of this year, the Hotel AC honored him with the award ' Image of Granada Flamenco ' . La Peña Flamenca 'La Parra ' decorates him with his logo and named him Golden Honorary Member . At the end of 2008 based on his hometown Huétor Tájar the Peña Flamenca that take his name and whose inauguration was attended by numerous personalities from the world of politics and culture. He has given lectures and master classes in flamenco worldwide.

Very resounding was his visit to Baghdad ( Iraq) where he did four performances and participated in panel discussions and debates in which he spoke about the civil war and its influence on culture and social ties between nations.
Juan Pinilla has participated in numerous radio and television , emphasizing ' RNE mornings ' with Juan Ramón Lucas, ' La Ventana ' , with Gemma Nierga , Juanjo Millás and Pau Dones and programs of Onda Cero, Cadena Ser Cope , Tele 5 or TVE. His interviews appear in media such as El Mundo, El País , Diario de Sevilla , ABC, La Verdad de Murcia, La Opinión de Granada , Journal GranadaHoy , Ideal and Cambio 16 , among others.

Las Voces que no Callaron 

The "Las voces que no callaron " is the title of his first book and his second solo album on the market . Edited by Dreamcatcher cooperative Seville, Juan Pinilla takes an entertaining study of Flemish artists who struggled with his singing, dancing and guitar for the attainment of freedom and democracy. As explained in the work, with the same aims, banish the " scary topic " that ensures " Flamingos are the sun 's heat ." Thus, analyzes the lives and adventures of such prominent names as Pericón Cadiz, La Niña de los Combs, Manuel Vallejo, Angelillo, Antonio Ruiz SolerAntonio ' The Dancer ', Carmen Amaya, Sabicas, Pena Son, Juanito Valderrama, Paco Moyano, Manuel Gerena, Menese José Luis Marín or El Cabrero, among many others.
On the disk that accompanies the book, Juan Pinilla is accompanied by the guitars of Paco Cortés, Rafael Rodriguez and Josele de la Rosa, and the voices and palms of Pepe and Villodres Fita Heredia . The work also contains the voices of the actors Emma Cohen and Paco Algora, reciting verses of Mark and Ana Gabriel Celaya, respectively, and is completed with lyrics bulerías 
Allan Poe and Gregorio Marañón, a 'Temporeras' of Montefrío, tanguillos, tangos, seguiriyas, fandango, mirabrás and cartagenera .

Awards 

 Trofeo 'ANGELILLO' Ateneo Cultural of Vallecas 2010.
 Prize 'POPULAR 2009' 
 Prize ARTE Y CREACIÓN del Instituto Andaluz de la Juventud 2008
 Prize IMAGEN FLAMENCA de Granada 2008
 INSIGNIA DE ORO of the Peña Flamenca de La Platería (Granada) 2008
 SOCIO DE HONOR e INSIGNIA DE PLATA of the Peña Flamenca La Parra Huétor-Vega 2008
 PREMIO DIARIO IDEAL "LOS MEJORES DEL PONIENTE GRANADINO" Granada 2013
 2007: Lámpara Minera del concurso del Festival Internacional del Cante de las Minas de la Unión (Murcia)
 1 prize Concurso de Los Montes en Íllora (Granada)
 1 prize por Granainas Ciudad de Granada
 2nd prize in the National Concurso Nacional de Torrox
 1 prize best young flamenco singer in Antequera (Málaga)
 2nd prize Concurso Juan Casillas. Cuevas de San Marcos (Málaga)
 3rd prize in the Concurso Nacional of Manlleu (Barcelona)
 1 prize 'Resto de Cantes Mineros' in the Festival Internacional de las Minas de La Unión en 2003, 2005 y 2006.
 2nd prize Cante por Mineras in the Festival Internacional de las Minas de la Unión en 2004
 1 prize Cante por Cartagenas in the Festival Internacional de las Minas de la Unión en 2005

Discography 

 Lámpara Minera Volumen 3, RTVE-Música, 2008.
 The songs of the outcast, Robbin Tottom, Hard Cover, New York, 2002.
 Las voces que no callaron, Atrapasueños, 2011.
 La copla popular andaluza en Gerald Brenan, Carambolo, 2013.
 Jugar con Fuego, with the Spanish poet Fernando Valverde. Valparaíso 2014.

Conferences 
 The formation of the 'hearers''', University of Granada, 2007 John Habichuelas: A singer made guitar. 2008 Flamingos in the Civil War, 2008. The voices that were not silenced, 2009. Manuel Ávila: 'cargaíllo' of songs and singers, 2009. Cobitos: The elegance of being singer, 2010 Flamenco in Granada, 2010 Dancers of Granada., 2010. The soleá of Pepe de Jun. 2010 Granada 1922. Fiftieth Anniversary and Centennial, 2011. Flamenco dancing "Lecture-Performance by Manuel Linan, Bilbao 2012. Al Andalusian authors atheism, 2012. Behind the pinch. 2012 All names of flamenco in Granada, 2013. Guitarists and luthiers Granada 2013. My interviews with flamingos, 2013. Political commitment in contemporary art.'' 2013

External links 
 Juan Pinilla wins the Lámpara Minera. El Mundo Journal 2007
 Juan Pinilla stopped tourning in South Sudan because of the war
 Article in the Público journal about Juan Pinilla. Shangay Lily
 Juan Pinilla travels to Iraq to participate in Festarab. Europa Press
 Program of the BBC with Juan Pinilla y Francisco Manuel Díaz
 The BBC comes to Granada to film flamenco commitment of Juan Pinilla
 Review of the album Lámpara Minera Volumen 3 ofJuan Pinilla 
 Interview with Juan Pinilla published in México.
 The singer Juan Pinilla in Soria
 Conference and spectacle of Manuel Liñán with Juan Pinilla in the Sala BBK de Bilbao
 Biography of Juan Pinilla in Deflamenco.com
 Reviews of Juan Pinilla. Estela Zatania. Festival de Jerez. 2008 
 Juan Pinilla stopped touring in South Sudan because of the war
 Article in the Público journal about Juan Pinilla. Shangay Lily
 Juan Pinilla make a tour in Cape Verde
 Juan Pinilla in the book fair of Havana
 Juan Pinilla. Teatro Bellas Artes. La Havana. Cuba. 2013
 Pinilla. Journal El plural.com 
 Juan Pinilla and Fernando Valverde prepare their album 'Jugar con fuego' 
 Juan Pinilla. The best of Poniente Granadino. Diario Ideal
 Pinilla in the Café España of Valladolid. Review of Ana Alvarado
 Juan Pinilla the cuban journal Juventud Rebelde

1981 births
Flamenco singers
People from Granada
Spanish male writers
Living people
21st-century Spanish singers
21st-century Spanish male singers